The TMU Bold women's ice hockey (formerly Ryerson Rams) program represents Toronto Metropolitan University in the Ontario University Athletics conference of U Sports. The first head coach in program history was Lisa Haley, having served in the capacity since the 2011–12 season.

History

Season-by-season Record 
{| class="wikitable"
|-
| style="background:#fea;"|Won Championship
| style="background:#dfd;"|<small>'Lost Championship</small>
| style="background:#d0e7ff;"|Conference Champions
| style="background:#fbb;"|League Leader
|-
|
|
|
|
|}

Season team scoring champion

Notable games

International players
Ailish Forfar : Ice hockey at the 2019 Winter Universiade

Awards and honours

OUA Awards
Ailish Forfar: 2017-18 OUA First-Team All-Star
 Brooklyn Gemmill, 2017-18 OUA All-Rookie Team

OUA All-StarsFirst Team2019-20: Erika Crouse
2017-18: Ailish ForfarSecond Team2018-19: Kryshandra Green

OUA All-Rookie
2018-19: Erika Crouse
2017-18: Brooklyn Gemmill

U Sports Awards
Erika Crouse: 2019 U Sports Rookie of the Year
Ailish Forfar: 2018 Marion Hilliard Award (for Student-Athlete Community Service)''

All-Canadian
Ailish Forfar: 2017-18 U SPORTS Second-Team All-Canadian

Team MVP Trophy
Lauren Nicholson 2019-20
Kryshanda Green 2018-19
Ailish Forfar 2017-18
Ailish Forfar 2016-17
Jessica Hartwick 2015-16
Jessica Hartwick 2014-15
Melissa Wronzberg 2013-14
Stephanie Chiste 2012-13
Kyla Thurston/Lauren McCusker 2011-12*
Dana Carson 2010-11
Jenny Young 2009-10

Ryerson awards
Erika Crouse, RSU Female Rookie of the Year (2018-19)
Teagan Gartley, Claude LaJeunesse Award - Academics (2019-20)

G. L. Dobson Trophy
 Janella Brodett, 2013-14 G. L. Dobson Trophy
 Jessica Hartwick, 2014-15 G. L. Dobson Trophy
 Ailish Forfar, 2017-18 G. L. Dobson Trophy (recognizing Female Greatest Contribution to Sport, Campus and Community Life)

Rams in professional hockey

See also
 Ontario University Athletics women's ice hockey

References

Toronto Metropolitan University
U Sports women's ice hockey teams
Women's ice hockey teams in Canada
Ice hockey teams in Ontario
Women in Ontario